A list of films released in Japan in 1974 (see 1974 in film).

See also
1974 in Japan
1974 in Japanese television

References

Footnotes

Sources

External links
 

1974
Japanese
Films